The 1908 Grand Prize of the Automobile Club of America took place at Savannah, Georgia on November 26, 1908.

The race
Louis Wagner won the closely contested race in his Fiat finishing less than a minute ahead of Victor Hémery's Benz.

Classification

References

American Grand Prize
American Grand Prize
United States Grand Prix
American Grand Prize
History of Savannah, Georgia
November 1908 events